The Tradition is a 2019 poetry collection by Jericho Brown.

The collection won the 2020 Pulitzer Prize for Poetry. Judges of the prize called the book "a collection of masterful lyrics that combine delicacy with historical urgency in their loving evocation of bodies vulnerable to hostility and violence."

Contents
I
 "Ganymede"
 "As a Human Being"
 "Flower"
 "The Microscopes"
 "The Tradition"
 "Hero"
 "After Another Country"
 "The Water Lilies"
 "Foreday in the Morning"
 "The Card Tables"
 "Bullet Points"
 "Duplex"
 "The Trees"
 "Second Language"
 "After Avery R. Young"
 "A Young Man"

II
 "Duplex"
 "Riddle"
 "Good White People"
 "Correspondence"
 "Trojan"
 "The Legend of Big and Fine"
 "The Peaches"
 "Night Shift"
 "Shovel"
 "The Long Way"
 "Dear Whiteness"
 "Of the Swan"
 "Entertainment Industry"
 "Stake"
 "Layover"

III
 "Duplex"
 "Of My Fury"
 "After Essex Hemphill"
 "Stay"
 "A.D."
 "Turn You Over"
 "The Virus"
 "The Rabbits"
 "Monotheism"
 "Token"
 "The Hammers"
 "I Know What I Love"
 "Crossing"
 "Deliverance"
 "Meditations at the New Orleans Jazz National Historical Park"
 "Dark"
 "Duplex"
 "Thighs and Ass"
 "Cakewalk"
 "Stand"
 "Duplex: Cento"

Reception
At the review aggregator website Book Marks, which assigns individual ratings to book reviews from mainstream literary critics, the collection received a cumulative "Rave" rating based on 18 reviews: 12 "Rave" reviews, 5 "Positive" reviews, and 1 "Mixed" review.

Publishers Weekly called it "searing" and wrote that Jericho's duplex form "yields compelling results".

Elizabeth Lund of The Washington Post called it "compelling and forceful because it wonderfully balances the dark demands of memory and an indomitable strength."

Awards and recognition
 2020 Pulitzer Prize for Poetry, winner
 2019 National Book Critics Circle Award for Poetry, finalist
 2019 National Book Award for Poetry, longlist
 2019 Lambda Literary Award for Gay Poetry, finalist

Publication history
  110pp.
  96pp.

References

2019 poetry books
American poetry collections
Copper Canyon Press books
Pulitzer Prize for Poetry-winning works
LGBT poetry